Raymond Tyler Downey (born September 23, 1968 in Halifax, Nova Scotia) is a Canadian boxer, who won a light middleweight bronze medal at the 1988 Summer Olympics. In 1990 he gained silver at the 1990 Commonwealth Games.  He is a member of Nova Scotia's "Boxing Downeys" family of fighters. His father was boxer David Downey. Raymond has four children a son Tylor Flint, daughter Raya Flint, also two younger daughters  Genevia and Summer Downey.

Amateur highlights
 Ray Downey was a bronze medallist in the light middleweight classification for Canada at the 1988 Olympics in Seoul, South Korea. His Olympic results were:

1988 Seoul Olympics

 Round of 64: Defeated Jorge López (Argentina) by decision, 5-0
 Round of 32: Defeated Norbert Nieroba (West Germany) by decision, 3-2
 Round of 16: Defeated Abrar Hussain Syed (Pakistan) by decision, 5-0
 Quarterfinal: Defeated Martin Kitel (Sweden) by decision, 5-0
 Semifinal: Lost to Park Si-hun (South Korea) by decision, 0-5 (was awarded bronze medal)
 Competed as a Light Middleweight at the 1992 Barcelona Olympic Games. Result was:
 Lost to Hendrik Simangunsong (Indonesia) 5-12

Pro career
Downey turned pro in 1994 with much success.  He retired in 2000 with a pro record of 16-2-1.

References

1968 births
Living people
Black Nova Scotians
Black Canadian boxers
Light-middleweight boxers
Olympic boxers of Canada
Boxers at the 1988 Summer Olympics
Boxers at the 1992 Summer Olympics
Olympic bronze medalists for Canada
Commonwealth Games silver medallists for Canada
Boxers at the 1990 Commonwealth Games
Pan American Games competitors for Canada
Boxers at the 1991 Pan American Games
Sportspeople from Halifax, Nova Scotia
Olympic medalists in boxing
Canadian male boxers
Medalists at the 1988 Summer Olympics
Commonwealth Games medallists in boxing
Medallists at the 1990 Commonwealth Games